The 2018 Ealing Council election took place on 3 May 2018 to elect members of Ealing Council in London. The Labour Party increased their majority on the council by gaining four seats from the Conservatives.

Summary of results

Wards and Results

Detailed Results

Acton Central

Cleveland

Dormers Wells

Ealing Broadway
In the 2019 General Election,  Alexander Stafford was elected as the Conservative Member of Parliament for Rother Valley, in South Yorkshire. He continued to serve as a councillor until 1 April 2020.

Ealing Common

East Acton

Elthorne

Greenford Broadway

Greenford Green

Hanger Hill
In the 2019 General Election,  Joy Morrissey was elected as the Conservative Member of Parliament for Beaconsfield. She continued to serve as a councillor until 14 April 2020.

Hobbayne

Lady Margaret

North Greenford

Northfield

Northolt Mandeville

Northolt West End

Norwood Green

Perivale

South Acton

Southall Broadway

Southall Green

Southfield

Walpole

By-elections

Ealing Broadway

Hanger Hill

Hobbayne (6 May 2021)

Hobbayne (16 September 2021)

References

2018 London Borough council elections
2018